Thomas Henry Bull Symons  (30 May 1929 – 1 January 2021) was a Canadian professor and author in the field of Canadian studies.

Biography
Born in Toronto, Ontario, he was the son of writer Harry Lutz Symons and Dorothy Sarah Bull, and the brother of writer Scott Symons. He attended Upper Canada College until 1942, and graduated from the University of Toronto Schools. He subsequently studied at the University of Toronto (B.A. 1951), Oxford  (B.A. 1953, M.A. 1957) and Harvard University.

He was the founding president of Trent University, serving as its president and vice-chancellor from 1961 to 1972. He served as chairman of the Ontario Human Rights Commission from 1975 to 1978, where he "helped lead major advancements, particularly for the LGBT community".
 
Between 1980 and 1986 he served two three-year terms as chairman of the board of the United World Colleges.

He was the chairperson of the Peterborough Lakefield Community Police Service.

On 17 August 1963, he married Christine Ryerson. They had three children: Mary, Ryerson and Jeffery.

His contributions to university leadership, Canadian studies, Commonwealth studies, United World Colleges, the Association of Commonwealth Universities, and other fields were discussed in Ralph Heintzman (ed), Tom Symons: A Canadian Life, published by University of Ottawa Press. His leadership in universities and in Commonwealth Studies was discussed in Donald Markwell, "Instincts to Lead": On Leadership, Peace, and Education (Connor Court, 2013).

Works
 Meta Incognita: A Discourse of Discovery - Martin Frobisher's Arctic Expeditions, 1576 - 1578 (1999)
 To Know Ourselves: The report of the commission on Canadian studies (1975)

Honours
 In 1976 he was made an Officer of the Order of Canada and was promoted to Companion in 1997.
 In 1977 he was made a Fellow of the Royal Society of Canada.
 In 1981 he received an honorary doctorate from Concordia University.
 In 1984 he received the Award of Merit from the Association for Canadian Studies.
 In 1998 he received the Governor General's International Award for Canadian Studies.
 In 2002 he was awarded the Order of Ontario.
 In 2012 he was made a Knight of the Order of St. Sylvester
 In 2012 he received the Queen Elizabeth II Diamond Jubilee Medal
 He is an Honorary Fellow of Oriel College, Oxford.

References

External links
 Thomas Henry Bull Symons at The Canadian Encyclopedia
 Canadian Who's Who 1997 entry

1929 births
2021 deaths
Canadian university and college chief executives
Companions of the Order of Canada
Fellows of the Royal Society of Canada
Harvard University alumni
Knights of the Order of St. Sylvester
Members of the Order of Ontario
People from Toronto
Academic staff of Trent University
University of Toronto alumni
Upper Canada College alumni